Jamal ol Din Kola (also Romanized as Jamāl ol Dīn Kolā, Jalāl Ed Dīn Kolā, Jalāl od Dīn Kalā, Jamāl ed Dīn Kolā, and Jamāl od Dīn Kolā) is a village in Chahardangeh Rural District, Chahardangeh District, Sari County, Mazandaran Province, Iran. At the 2006 census, its population was 106, in 43 families.

References 

Populated places in Sari County